What Did You Do in the War, Daddy? is a 1966 comedy DeLuxe Color film written by William Peter Blatty and directed by Blake Edwards for the Mirisch Company in Panavision. It stars James Coburn and Dick Shawn. In what had been a cow pasture, designer Fernando Carrere fabricated a storybook Sicilian village which added $800,000 to the production's already elevated $5.5 million budget.

Plot
During the Allied invasion of Sicily, an outfit of U.S. soldiers is assigned to capture the small town of "Valerno", but upon arrival, they discover that the Italian Army garrison led by Captain Fausto Oppo (Sergio Fantoni) have been expecting them. They will willingly surrender and turn themselves over to the Americans' rule, provided they are permitted to complete a soccer match and a wine festival.

Romance and frivolity ensue, as a reluctant, by-the-book Capt. Cash (Dick Shawn) is persuaded by easy-going Lt. Christian (James Coburn) to go along with the locals' wishes. Christian convinces Cash to send a message to headquarters that they have encountered resistance. After an aerial reconnaissance of the town, the Germans mistaking the festival for an attack. A nearby German Panzer unit is ordered come to the Italians' aid, but the Americans accidentally end up conquering all.

Cast
 James Coburn as Lieutenant Jody Christian
 Dick Shawn as Captain Lionel Cash
 Sergio Fantoni as Captain Fausto Oppo
 Giovanna Ralli as Gina Romano
 Aldo Ray as Sergeant Rizzo
 Harry Morgan as Major Pott
 Carroll O'Connor as General Max Bolt
 Leon Askin as Colonel Kastorp
 Rico Cattani as Benedetto (as Henry Rico Cattani)
 Jay Novello as Mayor Giuseppe Romano
 Ralph Manza as Waiter
 Vito Scotti as Frederico
 Johnny Seven as Vittorio
 Art Lewis as Needleman
 William Bryant as Minow
 Kurt Kreuger as German Captain

Production
The title of the film came to Edwards when he was asked the question by his son Geoffrey. As Edwards was having marital problems at the time, he did not want to leave the United States, so Mirisch Productions agreed to film the movie in Lake Sherwood, California, for $5 million that included the construction of a large Italian village set. In his study of Edwards, Myron Meisel stated that Coburn imitated Blake Edwards' mannerisms throughout the film.

The film was the first of what was originally intended to be six Mirisch-Geoffrey Productions between Edwards and the Mirisch Company. Only one other film, The Party, was completed.

William Peter Blatty recalled that Edwards and he originally agreed to make the film grim and without comedy for the first 20 minutes. This idea was shelved when, during the scene where Captain Cash visits Charlie Company at their chow line, he holds out his hand and one of the GI mess orderlies ladles beans into the captain's hand.

Reception
The film grossed $2,650,000 at the box office.

On review aggregator Rotten Tomatoes, the film has an approval rating of 50% based on 12 reviews, with an average score of 5.80/10.

Music 
The score is by Henry Mancini. It includes "The Swing March" and "In the Arms of Love".

References

External links
 
 
 

1966 films
1966 comedy films
Films directed by Blake Edwards
Italian Campaign of World War II films
Military humor in film
American comedy films
Films set in Italy
Films with screenplays by William Peter Blatty
Films scored by Henry Mancini
1960s American films